Schizolaena milleri is a tree in the family Sarcolaenaceae. It is endemic to Madagascar. It is named for the botanical collector James Spencer Miller.

Description
Its papery leaves are elliptic to ovate in shape and are coloured grayish green above, brown tinged red below. The inflorescences typically bear four flowers, each with three sepals and five bright pink petals.

Distribution and habitat
Schizolaena milleri is known only from the northeastern regions of Analanjirofo and Atsinanana. Its habitat is humid forest from sea-level to  altitude.

References

milleri
Endemic flora of Madagascar
Trees of Madagascar
Plants described in 1999